Hasanabad (also Romanized as Ḩasanābād; also known as Hasānak) is a village in Karizan Rural District, Nasrabad District, Torbat-e Jam County, Razavi Khorasan Province, Iran. At the 2006 census, its population was 934, in 227 families.

References 

Populated places in Torbat-e Jam County